Jonathan Elihu Silverman (born August 5, 1966) is an American actor, known for his roles in the comedy films Brighton Beach Memoirs, Weekend at Bernie's, and its sequel Weekend at Bernie's II.

Early life and education
Silverman was born in Los Angeles, California, to a Jewish family. He is the son of Devora (née Halaban) and Hillel Emanuel Silverman, a rabbi. He is the grandson of famous Conservative Rabbi Morris Silverman. His mother is from Jerusalem, where her family has lived since the establishment of Israel. He graduated Beverly Hills High School in 1984 and is friends with David Schwimmer, who was a classmate.

Career
Silverman is known for his roles the films Girls Just Want to Have Fun (1985), Brighton Beach Memoirs (1986) (a film version of the first play of Neil Simon's Eugene Trilogy), Caddyshack II (1988), Weekend at Bernie's (1989), Little Sister (1992), and
Little Big League (1994), He played the role of Eddie in Beethoven's Big Break, as well as starred in the film Jam (2006).

Silverman began his career on television, with a recurring role on the sitcom Gimme A Break! from 1984 to 1986. From 1995 to 1997, Silverman played the title role in the television NBC sitcom The Single Guy. In the 2000s. Silverman was a main cast member on the sitcoms In Case of Emergency. and Significant Mother. He has also made guest appearances on Friends (in the episode "The One with the Birth"), CSI: Miami, Psych, Hot in Cleveland, and White Collar. In 2014, he guest starred on Law & Order: Special Victims Unit as a controversial standup comedian.

Personal life
Silverman has been married to actress Jennifer Finnigan since 2007; the two met at a barbecue in 2004. He and Finnigan have a daughter, Ella Jack, born on September 29, 2017.

Philanthropy
In 2004, Silverman was a participant in the first-ever US television advertising campaign supporting donations to Jewish federations. The program featured "film and television personalities celebrating their Jewish heritage and promoting charitable giving to the Jewish community" and included Greg Grunberg, Marlee Matlin, Joshua Malina, and Kevin Weisman.

Filmography

Film

Television

References

External links

1966 births
Living people
American male film actors
American male television actors
Male actors from Los Angeles
Jewish American male actors
20th-century American male actors
21st-century American male actors
21st-century American Jews